Mauricio Andrés Pellegrino Luna (born 5 October 1971) is an Argentine former professional footballer who played as a centre-back, currently the manager of Chilean club Universidad de Chile.

After nearly one decade with Vélez Sarsfield, Pellegrino spent the vast majority of his remaining career in Spain, amassing La Liga totals of 176 games and five goals over the course of eight seasons for three clubs, notably Valencia with which he won three titles (he won nine while in Argentina). He also had a six-month stint with Liverpool, and appeared with Argentina at the 1997 Copa América.

Pellegrino embarked on a managerial career after retiring, notably working two years with Estudiantes and leading Alavés to the 2017 Copa del Rey Final. For eight months, he was in charge of Southampton in the Premier League.

Playing career

Club

Vélez and Barcelona
Born in Leones, Córdoba, Pellegrino played for Club Atlético Vélez Sarsfield during a large portion of the 1990s, as the Buenos Aires-based club experienced its golden age, winning four Primeira División championships and the 1994 Intercontinental and Libertadores Cups. He received the nickname El Flaco ("The Lanky One") for his physique.

He had his first experience abroad in 1998–99, joining Louis van Gaal's FC Barcelona on loan. He made his La Liga debut on 12 September 1998 in a 1–0 home win against CF Extremadura, and would be used regularly during the campaign, which ended with league conquest.

Valencia
Pellegrino had his best years with another Spanish side, Valencia CF, partnering countryman Roberto Ayala in the heart of the back-four while helping them to two league titles during his tenure, with the addition of the 2003–04 edition of the UEFA Cup.

Arguably his worst moment occurred during the 2000–01 final of the UEFA Champions League as he missed the last penalty shootout attempt against FC Bayern Munich (1–1 after 120 minutes)– he also played in the previous season's decisive match, which also ended in defeat, to Real Madrid (0–3). Overall though, in his six years at the Mestalla Stadium, he was a very important defensive unit, and amassed 213 official appearances for the Che.

Liverpool and retirement
In early January 2005, after having been frozen out by Claudio Ranieri, Pellegrino joined former Valencia boss Rafael Benítez at Liverpool on a free transfer, signing a six-month contract– this move made him the first Argentine player in the history of the club. He played 12 times for the Reds in the Premier League – 13 overall – but his performances were not enough to secure a longer contract, and he was released by the club at the end of the season. He was cup-tied for the Champions League campaign, and did not feature in the victory over A.C. Milan in the final of the competition.

Afterwards, Pellegrino returned to Spain, having an unassuming stint with Deportivo Alavés (fewer than half of the matches played, first division relegation).

International
Pellegrino earned three caps for Argentina, all during 1997. He was picked for the squad at that year's Copa América and made his debut in the continental tournament against Ecuador in the group stage.

Coaching career

After retiring in June 2006, Pellegrino stayed connected with Valencia, coaching its Cadete B (youth team). Two years later he decided to return to Liverpool, who still had Benítez in charge, as first-team coach, a position in which he remained until the middle of 2010 as the pair moved to Inter Milan.

In December 2010, as Benítez resigned from his post, Pellegrino was also dismissed. On 7 May 2012 he was appointed at former club Valencia, signing for two years as a replacement for Unai Emery who left at the end of the season.

On 1 December 2012, following a 2–5 home loss against Real Sociedad which left the side in 12th place, Pellegrino was relieved of his duties. He subsequently returned to his country, signing with Estudiantes de La Plata.

On 14 April 2015, Pellegrino was sacked by president Juan Sebastián Verón. In June, he was appointed at fellow league team Club Atlético Independiente.

Pellegrino returned to Alavés on 26 June 2016, being named José Bordalás's successor as the club had just been promoted to the top flight. In his first season he qualified the team for the final of the Copa del Rey for the first time ever, after a 1–0 aggregate defeat of RC Celta de Vigo; in the decisive match, played in Madrid, they lost 3–1 to Barcelona.

On 23 June 2017, Pellegrino was appointed manager of Southampton on a three-year contract. He was dismissed the following 12 March, with the team at risk of relegation after winning one of their last 17 matches.

Pellegrino returned to the Spanish top division on 2 June 2018, signing a one-year deal with CD Leganés. In October 2019, as the side was last in the standings with only two points, he left by mutual consent.

On 16 April 2020, Pellegrino replaced Gabriel Heinze at the helm of Vélez Sarsfield and agreed to a contract until June 2021. At its conclusion, it was extended for another twelve months. 

Pellegrino's Vélez side reached the semi-finals of the Copa Sudamericana in his first year, being eliminated 4–0 on aggregate by compatriots Club Atlético Lanús. Domestically, they came runners-up to Club Atlético River Plate in the 2021 season. Holding a 56% winning percentage over his entire spell, he resigned on 23 March 2022 after a poor start to the Copa de la Liga Profesional.

On 29 November 2022, Pellegrino was appointed manager of Universidad de Chile.

Personal life
Pellegrino's son and brother, Mateo and Maximiliano, were also footballers. The former made his professional debut for Vélez under his management.

Managerial statistics

Honours

Player
Vélez Sarsfield
Argentine Primera División: 1993 Clausura, 1995 Apertura, 1996 Clausura, 1998 Clausura
Copa Libertadores: 1994
Intercontinental Cup: 1994
Supercopa Sudamericana: 1996
Copa Interamericana: 1994
Recopa Sudamericana: 1997

Barcelona
La Liga: 1998–99

Valencia
La Liga: 2001–02, 2003–04
UEFA Cup: 2003–04
UEFA Champions League runner-up: 1999–2000, 2000–01

Liverpool
Football League Cup runner-up: 2004–05

Manager
Alavés
Copa del Rey runner-up: 2016–17

References

External links

CiberChe biography and stats 
Liverpool historic profile

1971 births
Living people
Argentine people of Italian descent
Sportspeople from Córdoba Province, Argentina
Argentine footballers
Association football defenders
Argentine Primera División players
Copa Libertadores-winning players
Club Atlético Vélez Sarsfield footballers
La Liga players
FC Barcelona players
Valencia CF players
UEFA Cup winning players
Deportivo Alavés players
Premier League players
Liverpool F.C. players
Argentina youth international footballers
Argentina under-20 international footballers
Argentina international footballers
1997 Copa América players
Argentine expatriate footballers
Expatriate footballers in Spain
Expatriate footballers in England
Argentine expatriate sportspeople in Spain
Argentine expatriate sportspeople in England
Argentine football managers
La Liga managers
Valencia CF managers
Deportivo Alavés managers
CD Leganés managers
Argentine Primera División managers
Estudiantes de La Plata managers
Club Atlético Independiente managers
Club Atlético Vélez Sarsfield managers
Premier League managers
Southampton F.C. managers
Universidad de Chile managers
Argentine expatriate football managers
Expatriate football managers in Spain
Expatriate football managers in England
Expatriate football managers in Chile
Liverpool F.C. non-playing staff
Inter Milan non-playing staff
Argentine expatriate sportspeople in Italy
Argentine expatriate sportspeople in Chile